Now Spring 2005 is a compilation CD released by EMI Music Australia in 2005. It is the tenth CD in the Australian Now! series. At 23 tracks, it has the most songs of any single CD release in the series.

Track listing
 Crazy Frog – "Axel F" (2:51)
 Gorillaz – "Dare" (4:05)
 Daniel Powter – "Bad Day" (3:49)
 Simple Plan – "Untitled (How Could This Happen to Me?)" (3:28)
 Rob Thomas – "This Is How a Heart Breaks" (3:51)
 James Blunt – "You're Beautiful" (3:20)
 Audio Bullys featuring Nancy Sinatra – "Shot You Down" (2:55)
 Paris Avenue featuring Robin One – "I Want You" (3:25)
 Ricki-Lee – "Hell No!" (Cabin Crew Remix) (3:20)
 End of Fashion – "O Yeah" (3:00)
 Kisschasy – "Do-Do's & Whoa-Oh's" (3:30)
 Missy Higgins – "The Sound of White" (4:50)
 Thirsty Merc – "When the Weather Is Fine" (3:22)
 Amiel – "Round and Round" (3:33)
 Tambalane – "Little Miss Liar" (2:24)
 Savage – "Swing" (3:31)
 Fast Crew – "It's the Incredible" (4:25)
 DJ Sammy – "Why" (3:29)
 Tom Novy – "Your Body" (3:31)
 Armand Van Helden – "When the Lights Go Down" (2:54)
 Uniting Nations – "You and Me" (3:04)
 Kylie Minogue – "Made of Glass" (3:11)
 Global Deejays – "What a Feeling (Flashdance)" (3:16)

References
 NOW Spring 2005 @ Australian Charts

2005 compilation albums
Now That's What I Call Music! albums (Australian series)
EMI Records compilation albums